The Mixed snowboard team cross competition at the FIS Freestyle Ski and Snowboarding World Championships 2019 was held on February 3, 2019.

Elimination round
Four-team elimination races were held, with the top two from each race advancing.

Quarterfinals

Heat 1

Heat 3

Heat 2

Heat 4

Semifinals

Heat 1

Heat 2

Finals

Small final

Big final

References

Mixed snowboard team cross